The Scarsdale diet is a high-protein low-carbohydrate fad diet designed for weight loss created in the 1970s by Herman Tarnower, named for the town in New York where he practiced cardiology, described in the book The Complete Scarsdale Medical Diet plus Dr. Tarnower's Lifetime Keep-Slim Program, which Tarnower wrote with self-help author Samm Sinclair Baker.

Overview

The diet is similar to the Atkins Diet and Stillman diet in calling for a high protein low-carbohydrate diet, but also emphasizes fruits and vegetables. The diet restricts certain foods but allows an unrestricted amount of animal protein, especially eggs, fish, lean meats and poultry. On Sunday the diet recommended "plenty of steak" with tomatoes, celery or brussels sprouts. The Scarsdale diet is low-calorie, 1,000 calories per day and lasts between seven and fourteen days.

The book was originally published in 1978 and received an unexpected boost in popular sales when its author, Herman Tarnower, was murdered in 1980 by his jilted lover Jean Harris. During her trial, Harris' lawyer argued that she had been the book's "primary author".

Health risks

Medical experts have listed the Scarsdale diet as an example of a fad diet, as it carries potential health risks and does not instill the kind of healthy eating habits required for sustainable weight loss. It is unbalanced because of the high amount of meat consumed. The diet's high fat ratio may increase the risk of heart disease. People following the diet can lose much weight at first, but this loss is generally not sustained any better than with normal calorie restriction.

Nutritionist Elaine B. Feldman has commented that high-protein low-carbohydrate diets such as the Atkins and Scarsdale diet are nutritionally deficient, produce diuresis and are "clearly unphysiologic and may be hazardous". The Scarsdale diet was criticized by Henry Buchwald and colleagues for "serious nutritional deficiencies". Negative effects of the diet include constipation, nausea, weakness and bad breath due to ketosis. The diet has also been criticized for being deficient in vitamin A and riboflavin.

See also 
 List of fad diets

References

Fad diets
High-protein diets
Low-carbohydrate diets